The Rice Village Museum is a food museum in Wan'an Village, Chishang Township, Taitung County, Taiwan.

History
The museum was established by Wan'an Community Development Association in 1994 by transforming an unused fertilizer warehouse to the Rice Village Museum.

Activities
The museum regularly holds various activities such as guided tours of rice farming and travel as well as painting activities.

See also
 List of museums in Taiwan

References

External links
  

1994 establishments in Taiwan
Food museums in Taiwan
Museums established in 1994
Museums in Taitung County